Joanne May Giles (29 November 1950 – 22 February 2011) was a New Zealand television presenter and former representative sportswoman. She represented the country in pistol shooting at the 1997 Oceanian Championships in Adelaide, and the 2000 World Cup in Sydney.  She was the first Kiwi woman to ride in a totaliser race (thoroughbred racing) in New Zealand, on 15 July 1978 at Waimate, and also competed in motorsport and Rock 'n Roll competitions.

Jo Giles was a candidate for ACT New Zealand in the 2005 general election.  She formed a local body political party "Christchurch City Vision" and was a mayoral candidate in the 2007 Christchurch local body election. With 14,454 votes, Giles came third after Bob Parker (47,033 votes) and Megan Woods (32,821 votes) in the election contested by ten candidates.

Jo Giles was later a TV presenter for the regional broadcaster Canterbury Television (CTV), with her programme "Shopping with Jo".

On 11 March 2011 police confirmed that she was one of the victims of the February 2011 Christchurch earthquake in the CTV Building. She had four children; Anna, Sam, Liv and James.

See also
 List of New Zealand television personalities
 New Zealand Women Jockeys

References

External links
Joanne Giles ISSF profile
Jo's pink racecar

1950 births
2011 deaths
New Zealand female sport shooters
New Zealand jockeys
New Zealand television presenters
People from Christchurch
ACT New Zealand politicians
Deaths in earthquakes
People associated with the 2011 Christchurch earthquake
21st-century New Zealand women politicians
Natural disaster deaths in New Zealand
Unsuccessful candidates in the 2005 New Zealand general election
New Zealand women television presenters